Ethmia sphaerosticha is a moth in the family Depressariidae. It is found in eastern Australia, including New South Wales and Queensland.

The forewings are white with a pattern of black dots. The hindwings are grey, fading to white at the base.

The larvae feed on the foliage of Ehretia acuminata. They live in a silken web constructed under a leaf. They are hairless. Pupation occurs in a crevice on the trunk or a branch of the host plant.

References

Moths described in 1887
sphaerosticha